Tutti Frutti is a song written by Little Richard and Dorothy LaBostrie, recorded in 1955, which was his first major hit. With its energetic refrain, often transcribed as "A-wop-bop-a-loo-mop-a-lop-bam-boom!" (a verbal rendition of a drum pattern that Little Richard had imagined), and its hard-driving sound and wild lyrics, it became not only a model for many future Little Richard songs, but also for rock and roll itself. The song introduced several of rock music's most characteristic musical features, including its loud volume, powerful vocal style, and distinctive beat and rhythm.

In 2007, an eclectic panel of renowned recording artists ranked "Tutti Frutti" at No. 1 on Mojo'''s "The Top 100 Records That Changed The World" and hailed the recording as "the sound of the birth of rock and roll". In 2010, the U.S. Library of Congress National Recording Registry added the recording to its registry, claiming the "unique vocalizing over the irresistible beat announced a new era in music". In April 2012, Rolling Stone magazine declared the refrain "the most inspired rock lyric ever recorded".

Original recording by Little Richard
Although "Little Richard" Penniman had recorded for RCA and Peacock Records since 1951, his records had been relatively undistinguished and did not result in the commercial success for which his producers hoped. In February 1955, he sent a demo tape to Specialty Records, which was heard by Specialty owner Art Rupe. Rupe heard promise in the tapes and arranged a recording session for Little Richard at Cosimo Matassa's J & M Studio in New Orleans in September 1955, with Robert "Bumps" Blackwell as producer and Fats Domino's backing band. The band included Lee Allen and Alvin "Red" Tyler on saxophones, Huey Smith on piano, Frank Fields on double bass, Justin Adams on guitar and Earl Palmer on drums.Penniman, Richard Wayne. "Little Richard." Little Richard 24 Jan 2008. GroveMusic.com (subscription only)

As the session wore on, Little Richard became frustrated that his anarchic performance style was not being fully captured on tape. During a lunch break, he started pounding a piano and singing a ribald song that he wrote and composed, and which he had been performing live for a few years. According to some accounts, he first wrote and performed the song while working as a janitor in a bus station. The song that he sang was a piece of music that he "had polished in clubs across the South." Little Richard sang:

After this lively performance, Blackwell knew the song was going to be a hit, but recognized that the lyrics, with their "minstrel modes and sexual humor", needed to be revised for lyrical purity.

Blackwell contacted local songwriter Dorothy LaBostrie to revise the lyrics, with Little Richard still playing in his characteristic style. According to Blackwell, LaBostrie "didn't understand melody" but she was definitely a "prolific writer".

The original lyrics, in which "Tutti Frutti" referred to a homosexual man, were:

These were replaced with:

"Aw rooty" was a slang expression meaning "All right". According to Charles Connor, Little Richard's drummer, the original lyrics were:

In addition to Penniman and LaBostrie, a third name—Lubin—is credited as co-writer. Some sources considered this a pseudonym used by Specialty label owner Art Rupe to claim royalties on some of his label's songs, but others refer to songwriter Joe Lubin.

As possible evidence that the "sexual song" theory was created later, songwriter LaBostrie was quoted as saying, "Little Richard didn't write none of 'Tutti Frutti'. I'll tell you exactly how I came to write that. I used to live on Galvez Street and my girlfriend and I liked to go down to the drug store and buy ice cream. One day we went in and saw this new flavor, Tutti Frutti. Right away I thought, 'Boy, that's a great idea for a song'. So I kept it in the back of my mind until I got to the studio that day. I also wrote the flip side of 'Tutti Frutti', 'I'm Just A Lonely Guy', and a spiritual, 'Blessed Mother', all in the same day." However, Phil Walden, co-founder of Capricorn Records, said that as a teenager, he had seen Little Richard perform an "off-color" version of "Tutti Frutti" before the song was recorded. LaBostrie was still receiving royalty checks on the average of $5,000 every three to six months from the song in the 1980s.

Blackwell said time constraints prevented the development of a new arrangement, so Little Richard recorded the revised song in three takes, taking about 15 minutes, with the original piano part. The song was recorded on September 14, 1955. Released on Specialty 561, the record entered the Billboard Rhythm and Blues chart at the end of December 1955 and rose to No. 2 early in February 1956. It also reached No. 21 on the Billboard pop chart. In the UK, it only scraped into the top 30 in 1957, as the B-side of "Long Tall Sally". The song, with its twelve-bar blues chord progression, provided the foundation of Little Richard's career. It was seen as a very aggressive song that contained more features of African American vernacular music than any other past recording in this style.

Richard's contract with Peacock had been purchased by Specialty Records owner Art Rupe, who also owned the publishing company that bought Richard's songs. Specialty's deal with Richard was typical of most record companies' dealings with their artists.

Impact
Combining elements of boogie, gospel and blues, the song introduced several of rock music's most characteristic musical features, including its loud volume and vocal style emphasizing power, and its distinctive beat and rhythm. The beat has its roots in boogie-woogie, but Richard departed from its shuffle rhythm and introduced a new distinctive rock beat. He reinforced the new rock rhythm with a two-handed approach, playing patterns with his right hand, with the rhythm typically popping out in the piano's high register. The song's new rhythm became the basis for the standard rock beat, which was later consolidated by Chuck Berry.

In 2007, an eclectic panel of renowned recording artists voted "Tutti Frutti" No. 1 on Mojo's "The Top 100 Records That Changed The World," hailing the recording as "the sound of the birth of rock and roll." In 2010, the US Library of Congress National Recording Registry added the recording to its registry, stating that the hit, with its original a cappella introduction, heralded a new era in music. The song was No. 43 on Rolling Stone's list of "The 500 Greatest Songs of All Time". In April 2012, Rolling Stone magazine declared that the song "still has the most inspired rock lyric on record." Bob Dylan writing about the song opined "Little Richard was speaking in tongues across the airwaves long before anyone knew what was happening. He took speaking in tongues right out of the sweaty canvas tent and put it on the mainstream radio, even screamed like a holy preacher-which is what he was."

The B-side
"I'm Just a Lonely Guy," the B-side ballad credited to LaBostrie-Penniman, has rarely appeared on albums or compilations in its original, undubbed mix, as heard on the single.  A remix featuring overdubbed female backing vocals appeared on Little Richard's third album, The Fabulous Little Richard.

Personnel
Little Richardvocals, piano
Lee Allentenor saxophone
Alvin "Red" Tylerbaritone saxophone
Frank Fieldsdouble bass
Earl Palmerdrums

Additional personnel
Justin Adamsguitar

Early cover versions
The song has been covered by many musicians. After Pat Boone's success with "Ain't That a Shame", his next single was "Tutti Frutti", markedly toned down from the already reworked Blackwell version. Boone's version made No. 12 on the national pop chart, with Little Richard's trailing behind reaching only No. 21 in February 1956. Boone himself admitted that he did not wish to do a cover of "Tutti Frutti" because "it didn't make sense" to him; however, the producers persuaded him into making a different version by claiming that the record would generate attention and money. Bob Dylan said of Boone's cover "Of all the people who sang "Tutti Frutti," Pat Boone was probably the only one who knew what he was singing about."

Little Richard admitted that though Boone "took [his] music", Boone made it more popular due to his high status in the white music industry. Nevertheless, a Washington Post Staff Writer, Richard Harrington, quoted Richard in an article:

Elvis Presley version

Elvis Presley recorded the song and it was included in his first RCA album Elvis Presley, released March 23, 1956. Presley's version uses "A-wop-bop-a-loo-bop-a-lop-bam-boom!" for every verse, finishing the phrase with "bam-boom" instead of "bom-bom". Elvis' cut of "Tutti Frutti" was also released as part of a four track EP (RCA EPA-747) and as the b-side of "Blue Suede Shoes" (RCA 47–6636) which reached #20 on the Billboard chart.

The Beatles versions
According to author Mark Lewisohn in The Complete Beatles Chronicles (p. 365) The Beatles performed "Tutti Frutti" live from at least 1960 through 1962 (in Hamburg, Liverpool and elsewhere). Reportedly the lead vocal was always by Paul McCartney, but it is unknown whether their version was actually based on the one by Elvis or that of Little Richard. No recorded version is known to survive. However, according to author Allen J. Weiner in The Beatles – The Ultimate Recording Guide (p. 225) during the massive Get Back sessions a version of "Tutti Frutti" was recorded. A few months later George Harrison played on a live version which was recorded in Copenhagen with Delaney and Bonnie and Eric Clapton which came out on an unauthorized release, though a legitimate version was also recorded in concert in England (and released in 1970). In 1972 Ringo Starr drummed on, and produced a brief version with Elton John on piano and T. Rex singer Marc Bolan on lead vocal. Lastly, in the 1990s Paul McCartney did a (professionally recorded) soundcheck singing "Tutti Frutti" but not like Elvis or Little Richard but instead like an extremely laid-back Pat Boone of 1956 (Boone's real version was more lively). The McCartney version came out on an unauthorized release, Soundcheck Songs Vol. 1.

Later recordings
Little Richard re-recorded the song in 1964 for Vee Jay Records' Little Richard's Greatest Hits and again in 1976 for a K-tel compilation titled Little Richard Live. Queen played the song live in their Magic Tour in 1986, and it appears on their live recordings Live at Wembley '86 and Hungarian Rhapsody''.

References

Grammy Hall of Fame Award recipients
Little Richard songs
Pat Boone songs
Elvis Presley songs
United States National Recording Registry recordings
Songs written by Dorothy LaBostrie
Songs written by Little Richard
Song recordings produced by Robert Blackwell
Specialty Records singles
RCA Victor singles
LGBT-related songs
1955 songs
1955 singles
1956 singles
1955 debut singles